Hotak is a Pashtun family name, and the name of the Hotaki dynasty.
People with the surname Hotak or Hotaki include:
 Abdul Aziz Hotak (died 1717), second ruler of the Hotaki dynasty
 Ashraf Hotaki (died 1730), fourth ruler of the Hotaki dynasty
 Ghulan Mohammed Hotak, Taliban fighter who defected to the Interim Afghan Government
 Hamza Hotak (born 1991), Afghan cricketer
 Hussain Hotaki (died 1738), fifth and last ruler of the Hotaki dynasty
 Mahmud Hotaki (died 1725), third ruler of the Hotaki dynasty
 Mir Wais Hotak (1673–1715), founder of the Hotaki dynasty
 Musa Hotak, Afghan military leader and politician from Maidan Shar of Wardak Province

Surnames